English Lake Provincial Park is a provincial park in British Columbia, Canada. Located near Revelstoke, British Columbia, English Lake Provincial Park has an area of 337 hectares.

References

Columbia Country
Provincial parks of British Columbia
Monashee Mountains
Year of establishment missing